Joseph Edward Taylor (December 11, 1830 – February 13, 1913) was a member of the Utah House of Representatives and the leading Sexton in Salt Lake City.

Taylor was born in Horsham, Sussex, England to George Edward Grove Taylor and his wife the former Ann Wicks.  He was raised in Tetbury, Gloucestershire, England.  At age fifteen he moved to Hull, Yorkshire, England.  He joined The Church of Jesus Christ of Latter-day Saints at this place in 1846.  In 1848 he began serving as an LDS missionary in England.  In January 1851 he left England to come to Utah.  But he fell ill in St. Louis and did not come to Utah until 1852.  He originally worked as a cabinet maker and set up his undertaking business in 1862.

In 1875 Taylor went on a mission to Nebraska, Iowa and Illinois.  Beginning in 1876 he served for many years as the second counselor to Angus M. Cannon in the presidency of the Salt Lake Stake, which at the time covered all of Salt Lake County.  Taylor became first councillor in the Salt Lake Stake presidency in 1884.  Taylor was elected to the Utah State House of representatives in 1896.

In 1904 the Salt Lake Stake was divided into four stakes and Taylor was released from the presidency.  He was then called as a patriarch.

Taylor had four wives.  He had 10 children with his first wife, Louisa Rebecca Capener.  Among his children by another of his wives, Lisadore Williams, was Alma O. Taylor, who was a key figure in the start of the Japanese Mission of the LDS Church.

Sources
Compton, Todd M.  A Widow's Tale: The 1884-1896 Diary of Helen Mar Kimball Whitney. (Logan: Utah State University Press, 2003) Notes, p. 728.
Deseret News, February 18, 1913, obituary of Joseph Edward Taylor
Orson F. Whitney. History of Utah. Vol. 4, p. 488.

1830 births
1913 deaths
Burials at Salt Lake City Cemetery
Converts to Mormonism
English Latter Day Saints
Members of the Utah House of Representatives
Mormon missionaries in the United Kingdom
Mormon missionaries in the United States
Mormon pioneers
Patriarchs (LDS Church)
English Mormon missionaries
British emigrants to the United States
Latter Day Saints from Utah